RealFlow is a fluid and dynamics simulation tool for the 3D and visual effects industry, developed by Next Limit Technologies in Madrid, Spain. This stand-alone application can be used in conjunction with other 3D programs to simulate fluids, water surfaces, fluid-solid interactions, rigid bodies, soft bodies and meshes. In 2008, Next Limit Technologies was awarded a Technical Achievement Award by the Academy of Motion Picture Arts and Sciences for their development of the RealFlow software and its contribution to the production of motion pictures. In 2015, Next Limit Technologies announced the release of RealFlow Core for Cinema 4D.

Overview 
RealFlow technology uses particle based simulations. These particles can be influenced in various ways by point-based nodes (daemons) which can do various tasks such as simulate gravity or recreate the vortex-like motion of a tornado. RealFlow can also simulate soft and rigid body collisions and interactions. The inclusion of Python scripting and C++ plug-ins allows users to program their own tools to improve RealFlow capabilities, adding control to most aspects of the RealFlow workflow including batch runs, events, daemons, waves, and fluids.

The RealFlow Renderkit (RFRK) is a set of tools designed to facilitate the rendering of fluids. The RFRK enables the generation of procedural geometry at render time and the rendering of individual fluid particles. With this interface, fluids can also be rendered as foam and spray.

On July 30, 2015, RealFlow 2015 was released to the public. The main features in this major release include:

 An increase in the quality of simulations.
 New DYVERSO solvers and GPU acceleration.
 Direct-to-render feature using Maxwell Render.
 Enhanced User Interface
 More controllabitlity: new splines nodes, text tools, daemons falloff, crown daemon, and spreadsheets
 DYVERSO solvers and rapid OpenVDB meshing speed up simulation times by 10x.

Plug-ins

RFConnect
RFConnect is a connectivity plugin between standalone RealFlow and DCC applications. The plugin is a successor of RF Connectivity and RF RenderKit (RFRK). The plugin supports following DCC applications: 3ds Max, Maya, Cinema 4D, and Houdini. The plugin is also available for Lightwave and Softimage but the development is currently not active.

RFCore
RFCore is a plugin for bringing RealFlow functionality to the DCC applications. The plugin supports following DCC applications: 3ds Max, Maya, and Cinema 4D.

Third-party plug-in developers
Next Limit lists three 3rd party plugins for Wetwork, IoSim, and V-Motion.

Version history

Features

RealFlow
 Particle based solver (liquid, gas, elastic and particles)
 Interaction bitmaps
 Custom particle behaviour
 UV data and weight maps
 UV texture mapping
 Automatic mesh generator
 Force fields
 Python / C++ plugins
 Direct-to-render feature
 OpenVDB meshing

Hybrido
 Hybrid fluid solver technology to simulate large bodies of water with secondary effects such as splashes, foam, and mist

Caronte
 Rigid/soft body dynamics solver
 Mix animation and dynamics

RealWave
 Physically accurate water surfaces

Python scripting / C++ plugins
 Daemons
 Waves
 Fluids
 Events
 Batch runs

Dyverso Solvers
 Drastic speed-up on simulations
 Smooth layered meshes,

Use in industry 
Motion Pictures

 Watchmen
 The Curious Case of Benjamin Button
 Sweeney Todd: The Demon Barber of Fleet Street
 National Treasure: Book of Secrets
 City of Ember
 Meet the Robinsons
 300
 Primeval
 Poseidon
 The Guardian
 Ice Age: The Meltdown
 X-Men: The Last Stand
 Slither
 The Da Vinci Code
 Chicken Little
 Robots
 The Incredibles
 Constantine
 Charlie and the Chocolate Factory
 The Matrix Reloaded
 The League of Extraordinary Gentlemen
 Spy Kids 3D
 The Lord of the Rings: The Return of the King
 Freddy vs. Jason
 Minority Report
 Final Fantasy: The Spirits Within
 Ice Age
 Lara Croft: Tomb Raider
 Lost in Space
 Pompeii (film)
 Jack Ryan: Shadow Recruit
 The Great Gatsby
 The Girl with the Dragon Tattoo
 The Avengers
 Looper (film)
 The Impossible (2012 film)
 Resident Evil: Retribution
 Dredd
 Ice Age 4: Continental Drift
 The Pirates! Band of Misfits
 The Lorax

Television series

 Lost
 CSI: Crime Scene Investigation
 Get Ed
 Rome
 U2/Green Day video clip: "The Saints are Coming"

Commercials
 Kraft Macaroni & Cheese
 Discovery Channel
 Coca-Cola
 Harpic
 Amp'd Mobile
 Strathmore Water
 Cinnamon Toast Crunch
 Nissan GT-R
 Bacardi
 Nickelodeon
 Mercedes
 Sony Ericsson
 Renault Laguna
 Nescafe Nespresso
 Kellogg's Frosties
 Chase Bank
 Guinness
 Heineken
 Grand Marnier
 Ariel Washing Powder
 Biotherm
 Vichy
 Nescafe
 Pontiac
 Gatorade
 Carlsberg
 Telia Xpress/Motorola
 Martini
 BMW
 Land Rover
 World of ColorVideo games
 Ryse: Son of Rome Crysis 2 Uncharted 3: Drake's Deception God of War: Ascension X-Men Origins: Wolverine (video game) Mass Effect 3''

See also 
 Particle system
 Smoothed particle hydrodynamics
 Computer simulation
 3D computer graphics

References

External links 
 
 Realflow Tutorials
 Realflow 2013 - New Features & Videos
 Realflow Templates

3D graphics software
Computer physics engines
Software that uses Qt